The History of Indian foreign policy refers to the foreign relations of modern India post-independence, that is the Dominion of India (from 1947 to 1950) and the Republic of India (from 1950 onwards).

Nehru's foreign-policy: 1947–1966
Prime Minister Jawaharlal Nehru, usually with the assistance of Krishna Menon, shaped India's foreign policy. At first, it was vague and rather grandiose dream of forging an international coalition of non-colonial and the colonized powers, but the world was rapidly bifurcated by the emergence of the Cold War between the West, led by the United States and Britain, and the East, led by the Soviet Union. It was urgent to develop policies regarding the Cold War, as well as relations with Pakistan, Britain, and the Commonwealth. The rest could wait. Nehru and the Congress looked on the Soviet Union with distrust, reassuring the West that there was not the least chance of India lining up with the Soviet Union in war or peace.  Nehru intensely disliked the Cold War—the more India got involved, he believed, the worse for his long-term objectives of economic and national development.  He took the lead in the non-aligned movement.

Nehru kept India's membership in the British Commonwealth, despite the widespread distrust of Britain across his Congress party. Popular grievances included the British UN delegation openly supported Pakistan on the Kashmir issue, Britain providing military advice to Pakistan, and London supporting the Dutch efforts to crush Indonesian nationalism. At that time the Commonwealth was little more than a debating society, but one objective was to use it as a sounding board for Third World interests. Non-membership would leave Pakistan in a stronger position. Another factor was the clear need for American help in terms of aid, loans, and trade. Nehru did not want to be too indebted to the Americans, and in that sense, the British and Commonwealth connection would be something of a counterweight.  He did insist that the symbolic importance of the King be strictly limited, so there was no sense whatever of royal sovereignty in India.

The Soviet Union was angry at India's hostility, and with the Kremlin control of the Indian Communist Party stirred up repeated attacks in Parliament and in media. Nehru set out to establish a conference of the states bordering the Indian Ocean, from Egypt and Ethiopia to the Philippines, Australia, and New Zealand. It was an ambitious plan and gave Nehru the opportunity to give advice to the recently decolonized governments in the region, especially Burma and Ceylon. The Indian efforts were plotted in the United States, but led nowhere. At the United Nations, the Soviets supported Pakistan and there was a move to demand arbitration or a plebiscite, but India steadfastly repudiated the notions. Nehru insisted that Indian troops would not be withdrawn from Kashmir.

With favorable publicity in America, Nehru and Menon discussed whether India should "align with the United States 'somewhat' and build up our economic and military strength." He made a major visit to the United States and Canada in October 1949. The Truman administration was quite favorable and indicated it would give Nehru anything he asked for. He proudly refused to beg and thereby forfeited the chance for a gift of a million tons of wheat. The American Secretary of State Dean Acheson recognized Nehru's potential world role but added that he was "one of the most difficult men with whom I have ever had to deal." The American visit was a partial success, in that Nehru gained widespread support for his nation, and he himself gained a much deeper understanding of the American outlook. He also stiffened his negative attitude toward the Soviet Union, and also towards the new communist state of China. Nehru was especially annoyed that Moscow had adopted a negative and destructive approach to South East Asia, apparently trying to destabilize the region. Informally, Nehru made it clear that it would help defend Nepal and South East Asia against any communist aggression.

Nehru dramatically changed course in 1950.  After first voting in the United States nations against the North Korean invasion of South Korea, India announced the only real solution was to admit Communist China to the United Nations. This position greatly pleased Moscow and Beijing but distressed Washington. In 1951 he refused to participate in the Japanese peace treaty, considering it an American imperialistic venturer to seize control of Japanese policies. The net result was that India gained prestige in the Third World, and set the stage for a close relationship with the Soviet Union. Pakistan, meanwhile, grew much closer to the United States and even seriously considered sending troops to fight alongside the Americans in Korea. This set the stage for an American transition to favor Pakistan strongly over India.

Nehru developed from Buddhist thought the Panchsheel (also known as the Five Principles of Peaceful Coexistence), which would be included in future agreements. Nehru based India's foreign policy on these five principles, as articulated in 1954:
 coexistence
 respect for the territorial and integral sovereignty of others
 nonaggression
 non-interference with the internal affairs of others
 recognition of the equality of others.
He did not mention a fierce determination to retain control of the Kashmir, a goal that would soon emerge.

Indira Gandhi foreign-policy: 1966–1984

The stated aims of the foreign policy of the Indira Gandhi premiership between 1967 and 1977 include a focus on security, by fighting militants abroad and strengthening border defenses. On 30 October 1981 at the meeting organised to mark silver jubilee celebration of the School of International Studies, Gandhi said, "A country's policy is shaped by many forces- its position on the map, and the countries which are its neighbours, the policies they adopt, and the actions they take, as well as its historical experiences in the aggregate and in terms of its particular success or traumas."

In early 1971, disputed elections in Pakistan led East Pakistan to declare independence as Bangladesh. Repression and violence by the Pakistani army led 10 million refugees to cross border in to India over the coming months. Finally in December 1971, Gandhi directly intervened in the conflict to defeat Pakistan's army in Bangladesh. India emerged victorious in the resulting conflict to become the dominant power of South Asia. India had signed a treaty with the Soviet Union promising mutual assistance in the case of war,  while Pakistan received active support from the United States during the conflict. U.S. President Richard Nixon disliked Gandhi personally.  Relations with the U.S. became distant as Gandhi developed closer ties with the Soviet Union after the war. The latter grew to become India's largest trading partner and its biggest arms supplier.

Foreign policy since 1989
After collapse of the Soviet Union and the end of the Cold War in 1989, India no longer had to deal with its nonaligned position in the Cold War. Diplomat Shivshankar Menon identified five major policy decisions.  They were: the 1993 Border Peace and Tranquility Agreement with China;  the Civil Nuclear Agreement with the United States in 2005;  the rejection  of force against Pakistan after the 2008 Mumbai attacks; dealing with Sri Lanka's civil war; and announcing a policy of No first use of nuclear weapons.

Pakistan

Relations between India and Pakistan have been complex and largely hostile due to a number of historical and political events. Relations between the two states have been defined by the violent partition of British India in 1947 which started the Kashmir conflict, and the numerous military conflicts fought between the two nations. Consequently, their relationship has been plagued by hostility and suspicion. Northern India and Pakistan somewhat overlap in areas of certain demographics and shared lingua francas (mainly Punjabi, Sindhi and Hindustani).

After the dissolution of the British Raj in 1947, two new sovereign nations were formed—the Dominion of India and the Dominion of Pakistan. The subsequent partition of the former British India displaced up to 12.5 million people, with estimates of loss of life varying from several hundred thousand to 1 million. India emerged as a secular nation with a Hindu majority population and a large Muslim minority, while Pakistan with a Muslim majority population and a large Hindu minority later became an Islamic Republic although its constitution guaranteed freedom of religion to people of all faiths. It later lost most of its Hindu minority due to migration and after East Pakistan was separated in the Bangladesh Liberation War.

Soon after their independence, India and Pakistan established diplomatic relations but the violent partition and numerous territorial claims would overshadow their relationship. Since their Independence, the two countries have fought three major wars, one undeclared war and have been involved in numerous armed skirmishes and military standoffs. The Kashmir conflict is the main centre-point of all of these conflicts with the exception of the Indo-Pakistan War of 1971 and Bangladesh Liberation War, which resulted in the secession of East Pakistan (now Bangladesh).

There have been numerous attempts to improve the relationship—notably, the Shimla summit, the Agra summit and the Lahore summit. Since the early 1980s, relations between the two nations soured particularly after the Siachen conflict, the intensification of Kashmir insurgency in 1989, Indian and Pakistani nuclear tests in 1998 and the 1999 Kargil war. Certain confidence-building measures — such as the 2003 ceasefire agreement and the Delhi–Lahore Bus service – were successful in de-escalating tensions. However, these efforts have been impeded by periodic terrorist attacks. The 2001 Indian Parliament attack almost brought the two nations to the brink of a nuclear war. The 2007 Samjhauta Express bombings, which killed 68 civilians (most of whom were Pakistani), was also a crucial point in relations. Additionally, the 2008 Mumbai attacks carried out by Pakistani militants resulted in a severe blow to the ongoing India-Pakistan peace talks.

After a brief thaw following the election of new governments in both nations, bilateral discussions again stalled after the 2016 Pathankot attack. In September 2016, a terrorist attack on an Indian military base in Indian-administered Kashmir, the deadliest such attack in years, killed 19 Indian Army soldiers. India's claim that the attack had been orchestrated by a Pakistan-supported jihadist group was denied by Pakistan, which claimed the attack had been a local reaction to unrest in the region due to excessive force by Indian security personnel. The attack sparked a military confrontation across the Line of Control, with an escalation in ceasefire violations and further militant attacks on Indian security forces. Since 2016, the ongoing confrontation, continued terrorist attacks and an increase in nationalist rhetoric on both sides has resulted in the collapse of bilateral relations, with little expectation they will recover. Notably, following the 2019 Pulwama attack, the Indian government revoked Pakistan's most favoured nation trade status, which it had granted to Pakistan in 1996. India also increased the custom duty to 200% which majorly affected the trade of Pakistani apparel and cement.

Since the election of new governments in both India and Pakistan in the early 2010s, some attempts have been made to improve relations, in particular developing a consensus on the agreement of Non-Discriminatory Market Access on Reciprocal Basis (NDMARB) status for each other, which will liberalize trade. Both India and Pakistan are members of the South Asian Association for Regional Cooperation and its South Asian Free Trade Area. Pakistan used to host a pavilion at the annual India International Trade Fair which drew huge crowds. Deteriorating relations between the two nations resulted in boycott of Pakistani traders at the trade fair.

In November 2015, the new Indian Prime Minister, Narendra Modi and Pakistani Prime Minister Nawaz Sharif agreed to the resumption of bilateral talks; the following month, Prime Minister Modi made a brief, unscheduled visit to Pakistan while en route to India, becoming the first Indian Prime Minister to visit Pakistan since 2004. Despite those efforts, relations between the countries have remained frigid, following repeated acts of cross-border terrorism. According to a 2017 BBC World Service poll, only 5% of Indians view Pakistan's influence positively, with 85% expressing a negative view, while 11% of Pakistanis view India's influence positively, with 62% expressing a negative view.

In August 2019, following the approval of the Jammu and Kashmir Reorganisation Bill in the Indian Parliament, which revoked the special status of Jammu and Kashmir, further tension was brought between the two countries, with Pakistan downgrading their diplomatic ties, closing its airspace and suspending bilateral trade with India.

Non-aligned movement

Nehru was the leader of the Non-Aligned Movement. It was the largest movement outside of the United Nations. After the collapse of the USSR some people are of the view that the movement lost its relevance,but it may be argued that non alignment remains relevant albeit with altered locus and focus.

Russia

The long-standing close relationship abruptly ended with the collapse of the Soviet Union in December 1991. The steep decline ended by the mid-1990s with the new partnership organized by the Russian leader Vladimir Putin. In the 21st century, the goals of Russian foreign policy include the expansion of economic cooperation, weapon and technology transfer, and cultural exchange. For example, Russia provided technical assistance to India's Kudankulam Nuclear Power Project.<ref>A. Kadakin, "Russia-India: The New 'Chakras' of Cooperation." International Affairs: A Russian Journal of World Politics, Diplomacy & International Relations. 2012 558#4 pp 45–56.</ref>

United States

China

See also
 Foreign relations of India
 Minister of External Affairs (India)
 Non-Aligned Movement
 Reform of the United Nations Security Council

 References 

Further reading

 Bajpai, Kanti, Selina Ho, and Manjari Chatterjee Miller, eds. Routledge Handbook of China–India Relations (Routledge, 2020). excerpt
 Bradnock, Robert W.  India's Foreign Policy Since 1971 (1990) 128pp; by a geographer
 Chacko, Priya. Indian foreign policy: the politics of postcolonial identity from 1947 to 2004 (Routledge, 2013).
 Chakma, Bhumitra, ed. The politics of nuclear weapons in South Asia (Ashgate, 2011).
 Ganguly, Sumit. India's Foreign Policy: Retrospect and Prospect (2012)
 Gopal, Sarvepalli. Jawaharlal Nehru Vol. 2 1947–1956 (1979); Jawaharlal Nehru: A Biography Volume 3 1956–1964 (2014), detailed coverage of his foreign policy.
 Gould, Harold A. The South Asia story: The first sixty years of US relations with India and Pakistan (SAGE Publications India, 2010).
 Guha, Ramachandra. India After Gandhi: The History of the World's Largest Democracy (2008)  excerpt and text search
 Heimsath, Charles H. and Surjit Mansingh/ A Diplomatic History of Modern India (1971), the standard scholarly histor, 559pp
 Jain, B. M. Global Power: India's Foreign Policy, 1947–2006 (2009)
 Kapur, Ashok. India: From Regional to World Power (2006)   online 
 Karunakaran, K. P. India in World Affairs, February 1950– December 1953: A Review of India's Foreign Relations (1958). online 
 Karunakaran, K. P. India in World Affairs, August 1947 – January 1950 (1952)
 Karunakaran, K. P. India in World Affairs, February 1950– December 1953: A Review of India's Foreign Relations (Oxford UP, 1958)  online 
 Konwer, Shubhrajeet. "Hallmarks of Current Indian Foreign Policy." Indian Foreign Affairs Journal 13#3 (2018). online 
 Malone, David M. et al. eds. Oxford Handbook of Indian Foreign Policy (2015), 746pp; 50 topical essays by experts.
 Malone, David. Does the elephant dance?: contemporary Indian foreign policy (Oxford UP, 2011).
 Mansingh, Surjit. India′s Search for Power: Indira Gandhi′s Foreign Policy 1966–1982 (1984)
 Mansinghm Surjit. Nehru's foreign policy, fifty years on (1998)
 Mukherjee, Mithi. "‘A World of Illusion’: The Legacy of Empire in India's Foreign Relations, 1947–62." International History Review 32.2 (2010): 253–271.   online free
 Raghavan, Srinath. War and peace in modern India (Springer, 2016), focus on Nehru.
 Rajan, M.S. India in world affairs: 1954–56 (1964)
  Shukla, Subhash. "Foreign Policy Of India Under Narasimha Rao Government" (PhD dissertation, U of Allahabad, 1999)   online free, bibliography pp 488–523.
 Singh, Sangeeta. "Trends in India's Foreign Policy: 1991–2009." (PhD dissertation, Aligarh Muslim University, 2016) online,  bibliography  pp 270–86.

Cold War
 Bassett, Ross. "Aligning India in the Cold War era: Indian technical elites, the Indian Institute of Technology at Kanpur, and computing in India and the United States." Technology and Culture 50.4 (2009): 783–810. online
 Cullather, Nick. "Hunger and containment: how India became “important” in US cold war strategy." India Review 6.2 (2007): 59–90.
 McMahon, Robert J. Cold War on the Periphery: The United States, India and Pakistan (1994)  excerpt and text search
 Rotter, Andrew Jon. Comrades at odds: the United States and India, 1947–1964 (Cornell UP, 2000).
 Singh, Rohini S. "It's About Time: Reading US-India Cold War Perceptions Through News Coverage of India." Western Journal of Communication 78.4 (2014): 522–544. online
 Touhey, Ryan. Conflicting Visions: Canada and India in the Cold War World, 1946–76 (UBC Press, 2015).
 Westad, Odd Arne. "The Cold War in India" in Westad, The Cold War: A World History (2017) pp 423–447.

China
 Chandra, Lokesh. India and China. (New Delhi : International Academy of Indian Culture and Aditya Prakashan, 2016).
 Chellaney, Brahma, "Rising Powers, Rising Tensions: The Troubled China-India Relationship," SAIS Review (2012) 32#2 pp. 99–108 in Project MUSE
 Frankel, Francine R., and Harry Harding, eds. The India-China Relationship: What the United States Needs to Know. New York: Columbia University Press, 2004. online; also   abstracts of chapters
 Garver, John W. Protracted Contest: Sino-Indian Rivalry in the Twentieth Century. (U of Washington Press, 2002).
 Guha, Ramachandra. India After Gandhi: The History of the World's Largest Democracy (2008)  excerpt
 Joshi, Manoj. "The Wuhan summit and the India–China border dispute." ORF Special Report 62 (2018). online
 Lintner, Bertil. Great game east: India, China, and the struggle for Asia's most volatile frontier (Yale UP, 2015)
 Lu, Chih H.. The Sino-Indian Border Dispute: A Legal Study. Greenwood Press: 1986.
 Miller, Manjari Chatterjee. Wronged by Empire: Post-Imperial Ideology and Foreign Policy in India and China (2013) online 
 Panda, Ankit. "The Political Geography of the India-China Crisis at Doklam." The Diplomat 13 (2017). online (Paul, Thazha V., ed. The China-India rivalry in the globalization era (Georgetown University Press, 2018).
 Rehman, Iskander. "India, China and differing conceptions of the maritime order." Project on International Order and Strategy (Brookings, 2017). online
 Sen, Tansen. India, China, and the world: A connected history (Rowman & Littlefield, 2017).
 Sidhu, Waheguru Pal Singh, and Jing Dong Yuan. China and India: Cooperation or Conflict? Lynne Rienner Publishers: 2003).
 Vertzberger, Yaacov. The Enduring Entente: Sino-Pakistani Relations, 1960–1980 (1983).

Pakistan
 Choudhury,  G.W. India, Pakistan, Bangladesh, and the major powers: politics of a divided subcontinent (1975), by a Pakistani scholar.
 Dixit, J. N. India-Pakistan in War & Peace (2002). online 
 Lyon, Peter. Conflict between India and Pakistan: An Encyclopedia (2008). oonline 
 Pande, Aparna. Explaining Pakistan's foreign policy: escaping India (Routledge, 2011).
 Sattar, Abdul. Pakistan's Foreign Policy, 1947–2012: A Concise History  (3rd ed. Oxford UP,  2013). oonline 2nd 2009 edition

Russia
 Budhwar, Prem K. "India-Russia relations: Past, Present and the future." India Quarterly 63.3 (2007): 51–83.
 Donaldson, Robert H. "The Soviet Union in South Asia: A Friend To Rely On?"  Journal of International Affairs (1981) 34#2  pp 235–58
 Hilger, Andreas. The Soviet Union and India: the Khrushchev era and its aftermath until 1966, (2009)   online
 Hirsch, Michal Ben‑Josef, and Manjari Chatterjee Miller. "Otherness and resilience in bilateral relations: the cases of Israel‒Germany, India‒Russia, and India‒Israel." Journal Of International Relations And Development  (2020) online.
 Mastny, Vojtech. "The Soviet Union's Partnership with India." Journal of Cold War Studies (2010) 12#3 pp 50–90.
 Rekha, Chandra. India-Russia Post Cold War Relations: A New Epoch of Cooperation (London: Taylor & Francis, 2017).
 Soherwordi, Hussain Shaheed, and Uzma Munshi. "China-Russia-Pakistan Strategic Triangle: Imperative Factors." South Asian Studies (1026-678X) 35.1 (2020) online.

United States
 Barnds, William J. India, Pakistan, and the Great Powers (1972) online
 Brands, H. W. India and the United States: The Cold Peace (1990) online free to borrow
 Brands, H. W. Inside the Cold War: Loy Henderson and the Rise of the American Empire 1918–1961 (1991) pp 196–230; Loy Henderson was US Ambassador, 1948–51
 Chary, M. Srinivas. The Eagle and the Peacock: U.S. Foreign Policy toward India since Independence (1995) online 
 Chaudhuri, Rudra. Forged in Crisis: India and the United States since 1947 (Oxford UP, 2014); online; DOI:10.1093/acprof:oso/9780199354863.001.0001
 Clymer, Kenton J. Quest for Freedom: The United States and India's Independence (1995)
 Gaan, Narottam. India and the United States: from Estrangement to Engagement (2007)
 Isaacs, Harold R. Scratches on Our Minds: American Views of China and India (1980) online
 Jain, Rashmi K. The United States and India: 1947–2006 A Documentary Study (2007)
 Kux, Dennis. India and The United States: Estranged Democracies 1941–1991 (1993)
 Martin, Michael F., et al. "India-U.S. Economic Relations: In Brief" Current Politics and Economics of Northern and Western Asia 24#1 (2015): 99+
 
 Mishra, Sylvia. "Forged in Crisis: India and the United States since 1947." Indian Foreign Affairs Journal 9#3 (2014): 301+
 Mistry, Dinshaw. Aligning Unevenly: India and the United States (Honolulu: East-West Center, 2016), focus after 2000   online.
 Mukherjee, Rohan. "Chaos as opportunity: the United States and world order in India's grand strategy." Contemporary Politics 26.4 (2020): 420–438 online.
 Raghavan, Srinath. The Most Dangerous Place: A History of the United States in South Asia. (Penguin Random House India, 2018).
 Rajagopalan, Rajesh. "U.S.-India Relations under President Trump: Promise and Peril." Asia Policy, no. 24 (2017). online 
 Rotter, Andrew J. Comrades at Odds: The United States and India, 1947–1964 (2000) online 
 Sathasivam, Kanishkan. Uneasy Neighbors: India, Pakistan and US Foreign Policy (Routledge, 2017).
 Schaffer, Teresita C. India and the United States in the 21st Century: Reinventing Partnership (2009)
 Tellis, Ashley J. ‘The Surprising Success of the U.S.-Indian Partnership: Trump and Modi Have Deepened Defense Cooperation Against the Odds’. Foreign Affairs 20 (February 2020) online
 Tellis, Ashley. "Narendra Modi and US–India Relations." in Making of New India: Transformation Under Modi Government (2018): 525–535 online.
Primary sources
 , US ambassador 1951–53 and 1963–69;   excerpt and text search
 Bowles, Chester. Promises to Keep (1972), autobiography; pp 531–79
 Galbraith, John K. Ambassador's journal: a personal account of the Kennedy years (1969) online, he was US ambassador to India 1961–63
 Menon, Shivshankar.  Choices: Inside the Making of Indian Foreign Policy (2016), former foreign minister explains decisions in five major crises since 1993.  excerpt
 U.S. Department of State.  Foreign Relations of the United States (FRUS), many volumes of primary sources; the complete texts of these large books are all online. See Guide to FRUS. For example, Foreign Relations of the United States, 1969–1976, Volume XI, South Asia Crisis, 1971 was published in 2005 and is online here. The most recent volumes are Foreign Relations of the United States, 1969–1976, Volume E–7, Documents on South Asia, 1969–1972 (2005) online here and Foreign Relations of the United States, 1969–1976, Volume E–8, Documents on South Asia, 1973–1976'' (2007) online here.

External links
 Briefs on India's Bilateral Relations, Ministry of External Affairs
 Harvard University homepage India's Foreign Policy, Xenia Dormandy

Foreign relations of India
Foreign relations